Peter Andrew Corning (born 1935) is an American biologist, consultant, and complex systems scientist, Director of the Institute for the Study of Complex Systems, in Seattle, Washington. He is known especially for his work on the causal role of synergy in evolution.

Biography 
Peter Corning was born in Pasadena, California in 1935. He received his undergraduate BA from Brown University and completed a Doctor of Philosophy in interdisciplinary social science-life science at New York University. Later he was awarded a two-year National Institute of Mental Health Post-doctoral Fellowship for additional study and research at the Institute for Behavioral Genetics at the University of Colorado.

After graduating from Brown University, Corning served as a naval aviator and as a science writer at Newsweek magazine for two years before returning to graduate school. After his post-doctoral studies, he taught in the interdisciplinary Human Biology Program at Stanford University for nine years, along with research appointments in the Behavior Genetics Laboratory of the Stanford Medical School and in the Department of Engineering Economic Systems. Since 1991, Corning has served as the director of the Institute for the Study of Complex Systems and as a founding partner of a private consulting firm in Palo Alto, California.
 
He was President of the International Society for the Systems Sciences in 1999, and is Treasurer of the International Society for Bioeconomics and a member of the board of directors of the Association for Politics and the Life Sciences. He is also on the  board of directors of the Epic of Evolution Society, and has been an actively contributing member of the International Society for Human Ethology, the Human Behavior and Evolution Society, the International Society for Endocytobiology, the European Sociobiological Society, and the International Association for Cybernetics. In 1996, he was also the recipient of a research fellowship in evolutionary biology at the Collegium Budapest, an international institute for advanced study, in Hungary.

Work 
Peter Corning's research interests are in the fields bioeconomics, and the research "in greater depth on specific sources and economic consequences of functional synergy in nature and its role in biological and socio-cultural evolution. One area of particular interest is molecular level cybernetic processes. Another concerns the progressive evolution of energy-capturing mechanisms".

Corning is known especially for his work on "the causal role of synergy in evolution. Other work includes a new approach to the relationship between thermodynamics and biology called "thermoeconomics", a new, cybernetic approach to information theory called "control information", and research on basic needs under the "Survival Indicators" Program".

Publications 
Corning has written seven books and more than 200 research papers and articles over the years. A selection:
 1969. The Evolution of Medicare: From Idea to Law. U.S. Social Security Administration.
 1971. The Theory of Evolution as a Paradigm for the Analysis of Social Behavior.  Ph.D.
 1981. The Synergism Hypothesis: A Theory of Progressive Evolution.  McGraw-Hill 
 2003. Nature's Magic : Synergy in Evolution and the Fate of Humankind. Cambridge U. Press
 2005. Holistic Darwinism : Synergy, Cybernetics, and the Bioeconomics of Evolution. U. Chicago Press
 2011. The Fair Society: The Science of Human Nature and the Pursuit of Social Justice. U. Chicago Press
 2018. Synergistic Selection: How Cooperation Has Shaped Evolution and the Rise of Humankind. World Scientific 
Selected Articles:
 1971.  "The Biological Bases of Behavior and Some Implications for Political Science." World Politics
 1975. "Toward a Survival Oriented Policy Science." Social Science Information
 1995. "Synergy and Self-Organization in the Evolution of Complex Systems." Systems Research
 1996. "Synergy, Cybernetics, and the Evolution of Politics." International Political Science Review
 1996. "The Co-operative Gene: On the Role of Synergy in Evolution." Evolutionary Theory
 1996. To be or Entropy: Or Thermodynamics, Information and Life Revisited, A Comic Opera in Two Acts. With Stephen Jay Kline. Prepared for the International Society for the Systems Sciences Annual Meeting, Budapest, Hungary, September 1996.
 1997. "Holistic Darwinism: 'Synergistic Selection' and the Evolutionary Process." Journal of Social and Evolutionary Systems
 1998. "The Synergism Hypothesis: On the Concept of Synergy and Its Role in the Evolution of Complex Systems." Journal of Social and Evolutionary Systems
 2000. "Biological Adaptation in Human Societies: A 'Basic Needs' Approach." Journal of Bioeconomics
 2001. "'Control Information': The Missing Element in Norbert Wiener's Cybernetic Paradigm." Kybernetes
 2002. "The Re-emergence of Emergence: A Venerable Concept in Search of a Theory." Complexity
 2002. "Thermoeconomics:  Beyond the Second Law." Journal of Bioeconomics.
 2007. "Synergy Goes to War: A Bioeconomic Theory of Collective Violence." Journal of Bioeconomics.
 2007. "Control Information Theory: The 'Missing Link' in the Science of Cybernetics." Systems Research and Behavioral Science
 2008. "What is Life? Among Other Things, It's a Synergistic Effect." Cosmos and History
 2010. "The Re-emergence of Emergence, and the Causal Role of Synergy in Emergent Evolution." Synthese
 2013. "Evolution 'On Purpose': How Behaviour Has Shaped the Evolutionary Process." Biological Journal of the Linnean Society
 2013. "Rotating the Necker Cube: A Bioeconomic Approach to Cooperation and the Causal Role of Synergy in Evolution." Journal of Bioeconomics
 2016. "The Science of Human Nature and the Social Contract." Cosmos and History
 2019. "Teleonomy and the Proximate-Ultimate Distinction Revisited." Biological Journal of the Linnean Society
 2020. "Beyond the Modern Synthesis: A Framework for a More Inclusive Biological Synthesis." Progress in Biophysics and Molecular Biology
 2021. "'How' vs. 'Why' Questions in Symbiogenesis, and the Causal Role of Synergy." Bio-Systems

See also 
 Teleogenesis
 Teleonomy

References

External links 
 Peter A. Corning, Director, Institute for the Study of Complex Systems, ISCS 2007.

1935 births
American architects
Living people
American systems scientists
People from San Juan County, Washington
21st-century American biologists
Symbiogenesis researchers
Presidents of the International Society for the Systems Sciences